Cecilia Parker (April 26, 1914 – July 25, 1993) was a Canadian-born American film actress. She was best known for portraying Marian Hardy, the sister of Andy Hardy in eleven of the Andy Hardy film series.

Early life and career
Cecilia Parker was born in Fort William, Ontario, Canada on April 26, 1914. She was brought to southern California as a child by her mother Mrs. Naudy Anna Parker. Her father was from England as English soldier. Parker graduated from the Convent of the Immaculate Heart in Hollywood in Los Angeles in 1931. At the time she resided with her parents, Mr & Mrs. Thomas J. Parker, at 546 North Fuller Street in Los Angeles, California. Parker was selected from among a group of extras to attend the Fox Film studio training school for younger players.

Soon she was selected to play opposite George O'Brien in The Rainbow Trail (1932). The Rainbow Trail, written by Zane Grey, was the novelist's sequel to Riders of the Purple Sage. Parker starred with Tom Tyler and Carmelita Geraghty in a 1932-1933 movie serial produced by Universal Pictures entitled Jungle Mystery. In July 1933, she was chosen to play the heroine in the Ken Maynard western, The Trail Drive (1933).  That same year, she was John Wayne's leading lady in one of the first singing cowboy movies, Riders of Destiny, and also appeared in Rainbow Ranch.

After playing the sister of Greta Garbo in 1934's The Painted Veil, Parker signed a seven-year contract with Metro-Goldwyn-Mayer. The studio wanted a blonde who resembled Garbo as a young girl. Her new contract called for a starting salary of $75 a week and scales up to $1000 a week for the seventh year.

In November 1935, Parker purchased a new home in Beverly Hills, California. The following year she joined the ballet school of Dave Gould at MGM, along with Maureen O'Sullivan. By the fall of 1936, Parker was studying singing.

She played Marian Hardy in the extremely popular Andy Hardy film series in the late 1930s and early 1940s. She was in the original Hardy film, A Family Affair, in 1937. Mickey Rooney played Andy Hardy in the series, supported by Lewis Stone, Ann Rutherford, and Fay Holden. The movies were directed by George B. Seitz. Her character, Marian, appeared in most of the films, and her romances were a recurring feature of the series.

Though she and the character she played were absent from the last two Andy Hardy films of the 1940s, she came out of retirement to play Marian Hardy in one more movie, in 1958. Andy Hardy Comes Home was an attempt to revive and update the series, but it was not a success. Parker then returned to the real estate business that she and her husband operated in Ventura, California and she acted rarely, thereafter.

Personal life
Parker's sister, Linda, was an actress who appeared in a number of uncredited roles in the early 1930s. Both sisters once tested for the same part in David Copperfield. Parker was a close friend of actress Anne Shirley. During the mid-1930s the two kept a standing dinner date on Thursday nights.

In 1938 she married actor Robert Baldwin, who helped her to become a naturalized American citizen in 1940.

Death 
On July 25, 1993, Parker died age of 79 after what The New York Times called "a long illness". She was survived by her husband, a daughter, two sons, five grandchildren and one great-grandchild. Her husband died in 1996.

References

Sources
 Bismarck, North Dakota Tribune, Fifth Hardy Family Picture Delightful, Friday, December 2, 1938, Page 8.
 Los Angeles Times, Film Outlook During Summer Assumes Rosier Hue, June 14, 1931, Page B9.
 Los Angeles Times, Chosen By Fortune For Screen Career, October 6, 1931, Page 10.
 Los Angeles Times, Rainbow Trail Announced For Loew's State, December 22, 1931, Page A7.
 Los Angeles Times, Tyler To Play Lead, May 31, 1932, Page A9.
 Los Angeles Times, Cecilia Parker To Lead, July 16, 1933, Page A1.
 Los Angeles Times, Court Accepts Young Player's Film Contract, July 25, 1934, Page A10.
 Los Angeles Times, Odd and Interesting, September 25, 1934, Page 19.
 Los Angeles Times, Around And About In Hollywood, November 6, 1935, Page A15.
 Los Angeles Times, Around And About In Hollywood, February 17, 1936, Page A15.
 Los Angeles Times, Around And About In Hollywood, February 18, 1936, Page A19.
 Portsmouth, Ohio Times, Cecilia Parker'', Sunday, November 15, 1936, Page 68.

External links

 
 
 Photographs and Literature

1914 births
1993 deaths
Canadian film actresses
Western (genre) film actresses
Canadian television actresses
Canadian silent film actresses
Canadian emigrants to the United States
Canadian people of English descent
People from Thunder Bay
Metro-Goldwyn-Mayer contract players
Actresses from Ontario
20th-century Canadian actresses